Lucius Salvius Otho Titianus was the elder brother of the Roman Emperor Otho (reigned 69 AD). As a Roman senator, he was consul in the year 52 as the colleague of Faustus Cornelius Sulla Felix, and appointed consul as his brother's colleague for the period from Galba's murder to the end of February. Titianus was given the daily responsibilities of the emperor by Otho when Otho left Rome to halt the advance of Vitellius into Italy. Subsequently, Titianus was appointed generalissimo in charge of the war by Otho  and was present at the First Battle of Bedriacum.

Titianus was a member of the Arval Brethren, serving as promagistrate at least five times beginning in the year 57 into the year 69. The sortition awarded him the proconsular governorship of Asia for the term 63/64.

Family 
Titianus was married to Cocceia, sister of the future Emperor Nerva (reigned 96–98), with whom he had a son, Lucius Salvius Otho Cocceianus. Cocceianus rose to become consul around 80, but was later executed under orders of Emperor Domitian, for having observed his uncle Otho's birthday.

References 

1st-century Romans
Imperial Roman consuls
Roman governors of Asia
Otho, Lucius, Titianus
Family of Otho